Bald Mountain is a name given to over fifty summits in California.
Sonoma Creek rises from its southeastern flank, the source of Bear Creek is on its northern flank, and its northeastern flank drains to the Napa River.
 In Fresno County there are four:
 In Calaveras County there are three:
 In Tuolumne County there are three:
 In El Dorado County there are two:
 In Mendocino County there are six:
 In Shasta County there are three:
 In Modoc County there are three:
 In Lassen County there are two:
 In Santa Barbara County there are two:
 In Tulare County there are two:
 In Sierra County there are two:
 In Nevada County there are two:
 In San Luis Obispo County there are two:
 In Siskiyou County there are two:

See also
 List of summits of the San Francisco Bay Area
 Bald Mountain, other mountains with the name

References

Lists of landforms of California
Mountains of the San Francisco Bay Area
Mountains of Southern California
Mountains of Los Angeles County, California
Mountains of Santa Barbara County, California
Mountains of Butte County, California
Mountains of Siskiyou County, California
Mountains of San Luis Obispo County, California
Mountains of Monterey County, California
Mountains of Mendocino County, California
Mountains of Nevada County, California
Mountains of Santa Clara County, California
Mountains of Napa County, California
Mountains of Sonoma County, California